Vindullus is a genus of huntsman spiders that was first described by Eugène Louis Simon in 1880. Though often considered a synonym of Olios, it has been validated as its own genus.

Species
 it contains eight species, found in South America and Guatemala:
Vindullus angulatus Rheims & Jäger, 2008 – Peru, Ecuador, Brazil
Vindullus concavus Rheims & Jäger, 2008 – Brazil
Vindullus fugiens (O. Pickard-Cambridge, 1890) – Guatemala
Vindullus gibbosus Rheims & Jäger, 2008 – Peru, Suriname
Vindullus gracilipes (Taczanowski, 1872) (type) – French Guiana, Brazil
Vindullus guatemalensis (Keyserling, 1887) – Guatemala
Vindullus kratochvili Caporiacco, 1955 – Venezuela
Vindullus undulatus Rheims & Jäger, 2008 – Colombia, Venezuela

See also
 List of Sparassidae species

References

Araneomorphae genera
Sparassidae
Spiders of South America